Shelsley Court (September 1869 – 20 May 1934) was a South African cricketer. He played in two first-class matches for Eastern Province in 1893/94.

See also
 List of Eastern Province representative cricketers

References

External links
 

1869 births
1934 deaths
South African cricketers
Eastern Province cricketers
Cricketers from Port Elizabeth